Manidhanum Dheivamagalam is a 1975 Indian Tamil-language film, directed by P. Madhavan. The film stars Sivaji Ganesan, Sowcar Janaki, Ushanandini, Shubha and Sukumari. It was released on 11 January 1975. The film was a remake of the 1969 Telugu film Buddhimantudu.

Plot 
Kumaraiya is a temple priest in a village, living with his wife Valli and younger brother, Sundaram. Kumaraiya is a believer of god, he is very much respected by villagers and believes that he encounters mystic experiences whenever he sees Sundaram is a non-believer. Troubles will plague him after he finds out that Sundaram has not only been creating problems for Dharmalingam the village head, but has also fallen in love and wants to marry Vijaya, the daughter of Dharmalingam's sister. Taking this as an advantage, Dharmalingam separates Kumaraiya and Sundaram and an old ruined house of their grandfather is given to Sundaram as his share. Sundaram modifies and establishes a school in it. Before Kumaraiya could even attempt to resolve these issues, the keys of the temple are taken away from him by Dharmalingham, and he can no longer pray nor converse with Lord. Things come to a boil after he is told that Sundaram has forcibly taken the keys, and Dharmalingam has stolen all the temple's jewellery, when they are searching for it a treasure of Kumaraiya and Sundaram's ancestors is found. Kumaraiya says he will use the treasure for development and Sundaram argues that it is the school which will lead to progress and not the temples. The rest of the story is about who wins the bet.

Cast 
Sivaji Ganesan as Kumaraiya and Sundaram (dual role)
Sowcar Janaki as Valli
Ushanandini as Vijaya
V. K. Ramasamy as Kanakku Pillai
M. R. R. Vasu as Dharmalingam
Sukumari as Kaveri
Sasikumar as Kannan
Shubha as Kalyani
C. K. Saraswathi as Sundari
M. Bhanumathi as Annakili
Kathadi Ramamurthy as Gopal
Veeraraghavan as Officer
Samikannu as Teacher
I.S.R as Marriage Broker

Soundtrack 
The music was composed by Kunnakudi Vaidyanathan, with lyrics by Kannadasan.

Reception 
Kanthan of Kalki appreciated the film for the cast performances and cinematography, but criticised the story.

References

External links 
 

1970s Tamil-language films
1975 drama films
1975 films
Films directed by P. Madhavan
Films scored by Kunnakudi Vaidyanathan
Indian drama films
Tamil remakes of Telugu films